Philip Spooner may refer to:

 Philip Loring Spooner (1879–1945), American tenor
 Philip L. Spooner Jr. (1847–1918), mayor of Madison, Wisconsin